Spike may refer to any of the following fictional characters:

People
 Spike Spiegel, from the Japanese anime Cowboy Bebop
 Spike, a main playable character in the Ape Escape video game series
 Spike (Buffy the Vampire Slayer), a vampire in the TV series Buffy the Vampire Slayer and Angel
 Spike, Fonzie's cousin in Happy Days
 Spike Fumo, the main character of Spike of Bensonhurst
 Christine "Spike" Nelson, a recurring character in the Degrassi franchise
 Spike Thomson, in Press Gang
 Spike Lester, on the soap opera Passions
 Spike (Marvel Comics), several Marvel Comics characters with the name
 Spike Freeman, another character in Marvel Comics' X-Statix/X-Force
 'Spike' (a.k.a. 'Butch'), town bully in the Nancy strip and comix
 "Spike" Stoker, a supporting character from Jasper Fforde's Thursday Next books
 Joshua "Spike" Cohen, a Jew from Tom Robbins' novel Skinny Legs and All
 Cecil "Spike" Wilson, in the DC Comics comic book Sugar and Spike
 Spike Lavery, on the soap opera All My Children 
 Father Spike, a high-church parish priest who is mentioned in CS Lewis' book The Screwtape Letters
 Spike (NX Files), in an action adventure web-show called NX Files
 Spike (Hollyoaks), in the UK soap opera
 Spike (Dragon Ball) or Akkuman, in the Dragon Ball manga series
 Michelangelo "Spike" Scarlatti, in the Canadian series Flashpoint

Dogs
 Spike (Peanuts), Snoopy's brother
 Spike and Tyke (characters), Tom's nemesis in the cartoon series Tom and Jerry
 Spike the Bulldog, a character in the Warner Bros. Looney Tunes and Merrie Melodies series of cartoons
 Spike (Rugrats), Tommy's adoptive dog from Nickelodeon's Rugrats
Spike, Heathcliff's nemesis in the comic strip and animated series Heathcliff

Video game enemies
 Spike (Mario), a recurring enemy in the Mario games, debuting in Super Mario Bros. 3
 Foreman Spike, an enemy in the NES video game Wrecking Crew
 Spike, a boss enemy in the video game Spyro: Year of the Dragon

Dragons
 One of three dragons featured in the My Little Pony animated television franchise:
 Spike (generation 1), a lavender dragon in the original My Little Pony series
 Spike (generation 3), a blue dragon who first appeared in My Little Pony: The Princess Promenade
 Spike (generation 4), a purple dragon in My Little Pony: Friendship Is Magic

Other
 Spike, Ace Ventura's  monkey
 Spike, a young Stegosaurus in The Land Before Time media
 Spike, an anthropomorphic Triceratops in Extreme Dinosaurs
 Spike (Dinosaurs), a character in the Dinosaurs TV series
 Spike, alien pet of Roger Wilco in the video game Space Quest V: The Next Mutation
 Spike, a porcupine from the movie Over the Hedge
 Spike, a female robot in Jeanette Winterson's 2007 novel The Stone Gods
 Spike the Bee, a character in Disney's Donald Duck cartoons